, also known as , was a Japanese film director, screenwriter, producer and actor best known for his low-budget and sensationalistic pink films made for his Aoi Eiga studios in the 1960s and 1970s. He has been called both "Japan's sleaziest movie-maker," and "a cult favorite among devotees of extreme cinema."

Life and career

Early career
Born in 1929, Nishihara worked as a professional boxer during the early post-World War II years. His success in this capacity led to his entry to the film industry as an actor, playing the role of a fighter in director Kōzō Saeki's 1947 Daiei film, Town Of The Iron Fist or Street of Iron Fists (Tekken No Machi). Nishihara served as Saeki's assistant director in the 1949 film, . In the early years of his career he worked as an actor and freelance filmmaker for several studios besides Daiei, including Shochiku, Mainichi Television and NHK.

Pink film and Aoi Eiga Studios
The first Japanese film to contain nudity, director Satoru Kobayashi's controversial Flesh Market, was released in 1962. It was shut down by the police and censored before it could be re-released, but the film became a huge box-office success. Even with the limited distribution it received as an independent production, Flesh Market, which was made for 6-8 million yen, took in over 100 million yen. With the success of this movie, the pink film genre—known as eroductions at the time—had been born. In the pink-boom atmosphere of the mid-1960s, many small studios were set up to produce these cheap and profitable softcore pornographic theatrical films. One such studio was Aoi Eiga, founded by Nishihara to produce his own films. Some have claimed the company was a "front" for the Osaka yakuza.

1960s
Nishihara made his directorial debut with Highway of Passion (1965). In 1966, Tamaki Katori, star of Flesh Market, joined Aoi Eiga and quickly appeared in many films scripted and directed by Nishihara. To Aim at... (January, 1967) was a crime drama, in which Katori is the only survivor after she battles with the three men with whom she has committed a major robbery. Weeping Affair (March, 1967) was a melodrama about Katori's relationship with a middle-aged man and his daughter.

Indecent Relationship (May, 1967) had Katori as a girl who is financially supporting her boyfriend by working at a hostess bar. When she finds out that the woman who owns the bar and her boyfriend are having an affair, she seeks revenge on them both. The Weissers judge this early work, "More back-alley junk from sleaze-meister Giichi Nishihara."

According to the Japanese Cinema Encyclopedia: The Sex Films, the main difference between Seduction of the Flesh (July, 1967) and Nishihara's other "cinematic excesses" is that Katori is raped not once, but twice within the film's 72-minute duration. The story had Katori suffering these assaults while her husband is away, and then committing suicide in shame.

Pink Telephone (August, 1967) was an atypical venture into comedy for Nishihara and Tamaki. The story concerns a man whose goal is to become Japan's number-one drunk. Abnormal Reaction: Ecstasy (November, 1967), was an erotic thriller in which Katori co-starred as the mistress of a man who has faked his death. When the "widow" discovers that her husband is not actually dead, she gets her revenge by arranging to have both her husband and Katori impaled on stakes while in bed. Japanese Cinema Encyclopedia: The Sex Films calls this a "somewhat restrained early project" for the director, adding, "[t]he violence is fleeting. Even the sex scenes are stilted when compared to Nishihara's later efforts."

Ripped Virgin (1968) had Katori as a high school girl who discovers that the man who raped her is actually her boyfriend. The Weissers judge this film "surprisingly refined" considering that Nishihara is the director. Exploiting the exotic appeal of a white actresses, Nishihara co-starred Katori with two foreign actresses in Aoi Eiga's Staircase of Sex (1968).

1970s
Nishihara's main actress, Tamaki Katori, left Aoi Eiga studios in the later 1960s, and then retired in 1972. With her, Nishihara had produced countless films for the studio which were profitable, but were not notably successful. It was not until he teamed up with actress Yuri Izumi in the early 1970s, that he began directing box-office hits. According to some Japanese sources, Nishihara and Izumi are married.

In the later half of the decade Nishihara and Izumi began making films for the major pink film studio Shintōhō Eiga. Nishihara's films for this studio include such titles as Please Rape Me Once More (starring Izumi) and Grotesque Perverted Slaughter (both 1976). About the latter film, the Weissers, in their Japanese Cinema Encyclopedia: The Sex Films report, "This is probably director Nishihara's best film, but that's like choosing from rat-bite fever, jungle rot, or tick-borne typhus. They're all pretty bad." Robert Firsching of Allmovie agrees with the Weisser's assessment, calling the film "Nishihara's most skillful film, as he concentrates on characterization and suspense far more here than in his usual sick rapefests."

His films of this period are noted for their "twisted plots delivered in an unnerving matter-of-fact style." A typical plot of one of Nishihara's "staggering sleaze-fests" of the 1970s can be found in Abnormal Passion Case: Razor (1977). The heroine of this film, Reiko, is worried about her father because he recently had a near-fatal heart attack while the two of them were making love. Out of concerns that he may have a stroke if their sexual relations continue, she goes to a lawyer for advice. The lawyer suggests that she get married so that her father will have to stop having sex with her. The lawyer then proceeds to rape Reiko. The rape is interrupted by a call from the lawyer's girlfriend. The lawyer then tells Reiko she can leave, as he doesn't need to rape her anymore—his girlfriend is coming over. Reiko persuades the lawyer to pretend to be her fiancée so that she can convince her father she's really going to be married. The ruse works only too well. The father believes her, and, in shock and grief, dies of a heart attack on the spot. Reiko then kills the lawyer with a butcher knife.

Nishihara retired from the film industry in 1985. In 2002 he published , his memoirs which recounted his eventful life and encounters with criminals. In September 2009, the 1960s careers of Nishihara and actress Tamaki Katori—working together and separately—were the subject of a retrospective at the Kobe Planet Film Archive. Summarizing Nishihara's career, Allmovie writes, "No one ever accused Nishihara of being the most subtle filmmaker in the world, but at least he manages to keep the tawdry proceedings lively."

Partial filmography

Notes

Sources
 
 
 
 
  (Nishihara's autobiography)

External links
 

1929 births
2009 deaths
Japanese male film actors
Japanese film directors
Japanese film producers
Pink film directors
Japanese male boxers
20th-century Japanese screenwriters